A bulkhead is a retaining wall, such as a bulkhead within a ship or  a watershed retaining wall. It may also be used in mines to contain flooding.

Coastal bulkheads are most often referred to as seawalls, bulkheading, or riprap revetments. These manmade structures are constructed along shorelines with the purpose of controlling beach erosion. Construction materials commonly used include wood pilings, commercially developed vinyl products, large boulders stacked to form a wall, or a seawall built of concrete or another hard substance.

Coastal property owners typically seek to develop bulkheads in an attempt to slow large landslide erosion caused by wave action.  Studies over recent decades have resulted in public awareness as to potential negative effects that bulkheads may bring to beaches and the interconnected habitat areas of fish, plants, and birds. Many states have enacted laws to protect beaches to allow for future use of the beaches, as well as protect these natural habitats.

The term bulkhead is also used in a similar but distinct context to refer to large pressure sealing isolation barriers which can be retroactively installed for temporary or permanent use during maintenance or construction activities.

Effects 

While bulkheads may serve their purpose to slow erosion at a bluff or beachfront, they commonly cause a domino effect of change to the beach profile. The increased wave reflection caused by their presence can result in an increased re-suspension of sand in the water in front of the bulkhead. This can lead to more sand being distributed in the alongshore direction, away from the beach profile. Due to coastal littoral drift, the sand would then instead be distributed toward the ends of the bulkheads, leaving larger gravel and sometimes bedrock in place of the once sandy beach.

Since sand is a natural habitat for several species of fish to lay their eggs and is also the only surface in which eelgrass can take root, these natural processes can no longer take place in this now sand-stripped location. The absence of eelgrass means that the spawning habitat for herring and the protection for juvenile salmon would no longer be present. This new sand-stripped habitat also encourages other species, such as kelp, to move in.

Gallery

See also
Bulkhead line
Riprap
Root wall
Seawall

References 

Shore Stewards News - Bulkheads and Your Beach - PDF
Shore Stewards News - Creosote - PDF
Washington State Shoreline Management Act
Johannessen, J. 2000. *Alternatives to Bulkheads in the Puget Sound Region: What is Soft Shore Protection & What is Not? In: Proceedings of Coasts at the Millennium, Coastal Society's 17th International Conference. July 2000. In Press.  
*Portions of article information obtained from 
(Soft Shore Protection as an Alternative to Bulkheads—Projects And Monitoring - PDF
First International Conference on Soft Shore Protection Against Coastal Erosion
Shoreline Management and Stabilization Using Vegetation

External links 

Washington Shore Stewards Website: Use soft armoring techniques when appropriate
Washington Department of Ecology Website: Washington State Shorelands & Environmental Assistance
Beach Nourishment on Puget Sound: A Review of Existing Projects and Potential Applications – PDF
Alternative Shoreline Stabilization Evaluation Project – Final Report, Prepared For:. Puget Sound Action Team. P.O. Box 40900 – PDF

Seawalls